In mathematics, the Seifert conjecture states that every nonsingular, continuous vector field on the 3-sphere has a closed orbit.  It is named after Herbert Seifert.  In a 1950 paper, Seifert asked if such a vector field exists, but did not phrase non-existence as a conjecture.  He also established the conjecture for perturbations of the Hopf fibration.

The conjecture was disproven in 1974 by Paul Schweitzer, who exhibited a  counterexample. The existence of smoother counterexamples remained an open question until 1993 when Krystyna Kuperberg constructed a very different  counterexample. Later this construction was shown to have real analytic and piecewise linear versions.

References
(2) 158  (2003), no. 3, 953–976

P. A. Schweitzer, Counterexamples to the Seifert conjecture and opening closed leaves of  foliations, Annals of Mathematics (2)  100  (1974), 386–400.
H. Seifert, Closed integral curves in 3-space and isotopic two-dimensional  deformations,  Proc. Amer. Math. Soc.  1,  (1950). 287–302.

Further reading
K. Kuperberg, Aperiodic dynamical systems. Notices Amer. Math. Soc.  46  (1999),  no. 9, 1035–1040.

Differential topology
Disproved conjectures